Stéphane Nomis born on October 23, 1970, in Versailles, is a former French judoka, member of the French national team from 1990 to 1999, who became an entrepreneur by creating Ippon Technologies. He is also involved in associations, creating the Ippon Foundation to fight against the digital divide.

Since November 2020, he has been President of the French Judo Federation.

In January 2023, he was promoted to Chevalier de la Légion d'honneur.

Sporting career
From 1990 to 1999, he trains as a professional judoka at INSEP and is part of the France national team under the direction of René Rambier at the French Federation of Judo. He trains with David Douillet, Djamel Bouras and Larbi Benboudaoud. Nomis earned medals in many championships, including a gold medal at the French Championships and a bronze medal at the European Championships. He managed to reach the finals of the French championships, and after a bronze medal at the tournament in Paris, he qualified for the European Championships for the second time. He brought his career to an end in 1999.

Business career

In 1999, Stéphane Nomis got a job as a salesman which allowed him to learn on the job.

In 2002, he created Ippon Technologies, an IT engineering services company. The firm is now present in Paris, New York, Washington, Richmond, Moscow, Nantes, Bordeaux, Lyon, Toulouse, and Melbourne, and now has more than 500 consultants (architects, UX Designers, experts, Scrum Masters, Product Owners, Cloud & Devops Engineers).

Achievements

References

1970 births
Living people
French male judoka
People from Versailles
Competitors at the 1997 Mediterranean Games
Mediterranean Games silver medalists for France
Mediterranean Games medalists in judo
20th-century French people